Edgar Keith Spinney,  (January 26, 1851 – May 13, 1926) was a Canadian politician.

Early life
Born in Argyle, Nova Scotia, he was an insurance agent and merchant.

Political career
He was elected to the House of Commons of Canada for the Nova Scotia riding of Yarmouth and Clare in the 1917 federal election. He was defeated in the 1921 election and the 1925 election. From 1920 to 1921, he was a Minister without Portfolio in the cabinet of Arthur Meighen.

References

1851 births
1926 deaths
Members of the House of Commons of Canada from Nova Scotia
Members of the King's Privy Council for Canada
Unionist Party (Canada) MPs
People from Yarmouth County